OldTown Berhad (doing business as OldTown White Coffee;) is Malaysia's largest halal-certified coffee restaurant chain. The company also manufactures and sells instant beverage products and mixes. It operates over 200 café outlets located throughout Malaysia and other countries in the region, such as Singapore, China, Indonesia and Australia, and has plans to expand into Vietnam, South Korea and Bangladesh.

Established in 1999 in Ipoh, Perak, the company was taken over by Jacobs Douwe Egberts Holdings Asia NL BV in 2017.

History
The company was established in 1999 in Ipoh, Perak. In 2005, the company expanded into the food service sector with the opening of a chain of café outlets based on the traditional Ipoh coffee shop setting and ambience under the brand name "OldTown White Coffee".

The company is publicly listed on Bursa Malaysia on the main board. In 2017, OldTown Berhad, was taken over by  Jacobs Douwe Egberts Holdings Asia NL BV (JDE), a Dutch beverage company, following an offer valued at RM1.47 billion.

Domestic market
In 2013, OldTown has 200 stores in Malaysia. The group achieved the 200th outlet in a period of 7 years.

Overseas expansion

Singapore 
As of 2015, there are 10 OldTown White Coffee outlets in Singapore. These outlets are certified halal by the Islamic Religious Council of Singapore (MUIS).

Indonesia 
Currently OldTown has 16 outlets in Indonesia in areas such as Java and Bali.

Australia 
OldTown planned to open 40 outlets in Australia in 10 years. In August 2015, Australia's first OldTown outlet was opened at Elizabeth St in Melbourne, but later closed in 2017.

China 
As of 2015, OldTown has four café outlets in China.

See also 
 List of bakery cafés
 List of coffeehouse chains
 Ipoh white coffee

References

External links 
 

JDE Peet's
Restaurants in Malaysia
Bakery cafés
Food and drink companies of Malaysia
Food and drink companies established in 1999
Coffeehouses and cafés in Singapore
Restaurant chains in Singapore
Companies listed on Bursa Malaysia
Malaysian brands
1999 establishments in Malaysia